Diego Simoni Cavinato (born 6 May 1985) is a Brazilian-born Italian futsal player who plays for Sporting CP and the Italian national futsal team.

Honours
UEFA Futsal Champions League: 2018–19

External links
Sporting CP profile

1985 births
Living people
Italian men's futsal players
Brazilian men's futsal players
Brazilian expatriates in Italy
Brazilian emigrants to Italy
Sporting CP futsal players
Brazilian people of Italian descent
Italian expatriate sportspeople in Portugal